Thomas Walter Williams (1763–1833) was an English barrister, known as a legal writer.

Life
He was the son of Walter Williams, a London attorney living in Lamb's Conduit Street, and entered St Paul's School, London on 6 November 1772. He then studied law and was called to the bar, but was not much known as a pleader, his reputation mainly deriving from his writings. He died in 1833.

Works
Williams wrote:

 A Compendious Digest of the Statute Law from Magna Charta to 27 George III, London, 1787; 3rd edit. 1809, 2 vols.; supplements in 1809 and 1812. 
 Original Precedents in Conveyancing, London, 1788–1792, 4 vols.; new edit. 1808. Williams is described as of the Inner Temple. 
 The whole Law relative to the Duty and Office of a Justice of the Peace, London, 1793–5, 4 vols.; 3rd edit., by Harold Nuttall Tomlins, 1812, 4 vols.
 An Abridgment of Cases argued and determined in the Courts of Law during the Reign of George III, London, 1798–1803, 5 vols. 
 The Practice of the Commissioners, Assessors, and other Officers under the Acts relating to the Assessed Taxes, London, 1804.
 A General Dictionary of the Law, London, 1812; new edit. 1816. 
 The Jurisdiction and the Duties of Justices of the Peace, and Authority of Parish Officers in all matters relating to Parochial Law, London, 1812, 2 vols.; new edit. 1817. 
A Compendious and comprehensive Law Dictionary; elucidating the terms and general principles of Law and Equity (1816)
 The Farmer's Lawyer, London, 1819.

Williams also edited the Law Journal between 1804 and 1806 with John Morgan, produced abstracts of acts of parliament, and in 1825 brought out a new edition of The Precedent of Precedents by William Sheppard.

Notes

Attribution

1763 births
1833 deaths
English barristers
English legal writers
English magazine editors
People educated at St Paul's School, London